Rixa of Werle (died 26 November 1317) was the only daughter of Lord Henry I of Werle and his wife Rikissa Birgersdotter.  Rikissa was a daughter of Birger Magnusson of Bjälbo and his first wife Ingeborg.

Rixa of Werle married on 10 January 1284 with Duke Albert II, Duke of Brunswick-L%C3%BCneburg.

They had 11 children:
 Luther, joined the Teutonic Order
 Bruno (died: 31 August 1303)
 Adelaide, married John, Landgrave of Lower Hesse
 Maud (died: 1 January 1356)
 Otto, Duke of Brunswick-Lüneburg (born: 24 January 1292 – died: 30 August 1344)
 Albert II (born:  – died: 13 October 1359), bishop of Halberstadt
 William (born:  – died: 1318)
 Henry III (born:  – died: 6 February 1363), bishop of Hildesheim
 Richenza (born:  – died: 26 April 1317), abbess of Gandersheim Abbey
 Magnus, Duke of Brunswick-Wolfenbüttel (born:  – died: July 1369)
 Ernest, Duke of Brunswick-Göttingen (born:  – died: 24  April 1367)

External links 
 thePeerage.com, page 535

House of Mecklenburg
Old House of Brunswick
13th-century births
Year of birth uncertain
1317 deaths
13th-century German nobility
14th-century German nobility
13th-century German women
14th-century German women
Daughters of monarchs